Quakerstown is a townland in the Barony of Ormond Lower, County Tipperary, Ireland. It is located between Shinrone and Ballingarry in the civil parish of Ballingarry.  Archives on the Placenames Database of Ireland indicate that a ruined Quaker meeting house stood here in 1840.

References

Townlands of County Tipperary